Hunan Township is a township under the administration of Linchuan District in Fuzhou, Jiangxi, China. , it has one residential community and 19 villages under its administration.

References 

Township-level divisions of Jiangxi
Fuzhou, Jiangxi